Michael Matt (born 13 May 1993) is an Austrian World Cup alpine ski racer. He specialises in the Slalom discipline and has competed in three World Championships.

Career
Matt made his World Cup debut at age 20 in the Levi slalom in November 2013, racing alongside his brother Mario. He competed at the 2015 World Championships in Beaver Creek, US. Matt raced in the slalom, but failed to finish the second run. Matt gained his first World Cup podium in Finland as the runner-up at Levi on 13 November 2016, and celebrated his first victory on 5 March 2017 in Slovenia at Kranjska Gora.

At the 2018 Winter Olympics in Pyongchang, South Korea, Matt finished the first run of the slalom competition in 12th place but moved up to third after the second run, securing himself the bronze medal. He was also part of the Austrian squad which took a silver medal in the team event.

Personal life
Matt is the brother of double World and Olympic champion Mario Matt and ski cross world champion  In 2001, at the age of eight, Michael Matt was buried by an avalanche.

World Cup results

Standings through 17 January 2021

Race podiums
 1 win – (1 SL)
 7 podiums – (6 SL, 1 PS)

World Championship results

Olympic results

See also
List of Olympic medalist families

References

External links

Michael Matt World Cup standings at the International Ski Federation

Austrian Ski team – official site – Michael Matt – 
Rossignol Skis – Michael Matt

1993 births
Austrian male alpine skiers
Living people
People from Zams
Sportspeople from Tyrol (state)
Alpine skiers at the 2018 Winter Olympics
Alpine skiers at the 2022 Winter Olympics
Olympic alpine skiers of Austria
Medalists at the 2018 Winter Olympics
Medalists at the 2022 Winter Olympics
Olympic medalists in alpine skiing
Olympic gold medalists for Austria
Olympic silver medalists for Austria
Olympic bronze medalists for Austria
20th-century Austrian people
21st-century Austrian people